Barrie Moore (born May 22, 1975) is a Canadian former professional ice hockey player.

Selected 220th overall by the Buffalo Sabres in the 1993 NHL Entry Draft, Moore played for the Sabres, Edmonton Oilers and Washington Capitals, playing 39 regular season games, scoring 2 goals and 6 assists for 8 points and collecting 18 penalty minutes.  In 1996, he won a Calder Cup with the Rochester Americans.

Career statistics

Regular season and playoffs

External links

1975 births
Buffalo Sabres draft picks
Buffalo Sabres players
Canadian ice hockey left wingers
Columbia Inferno players
Coventry Blaze players
Edmonton Oilers players
Hamilton Bulldogs (AHL) players
Sportspeople from London, Ontario
Indianapolis Ice players
Living people
Manchester Storm (1995–2002) players
Manitoba Moose (IHL) players
Missouri River Otters players
Portland Pirates players
Rochester Americans players
Sudbury Wolves players
Washington Capitals players
Ice hockey people from Ontario
Canadian expatriate ice hockey players in England